Bánk bán (or Bánk the Palatine) is a Hungarian play, written by József Katona. It was first produced in 1819.

References 

Hungarian plays
1819 plays